Edwin Makromallis, also known as Ed Case, is a London-based musician, producer, songwriter, and DJ.

Early life
Edwin Makromallis' musical talent was evident at a young age.  He achieved 'merits' and 'distinctions' up to grade 5 with the piano. At 15, he took part in a work placement opportunity at a recording studio, where he learnt the techniques of audio production.

Career beginnings
Ed Case began his music career in the illegal rave scene of the late 1980s. This was followed by a stint working in hardcore and drum & bass clubs. Case however made his name in the UK garage scene of the late 1990s. He hosted a show on pirate radio, Freek FM. He released a string of underground hits, including "Something in Your Eyes" featuring Shelley Nelson, which peaked at 38 in the UK top 40. This track represented a dual turning point, since it was the first time Case had had a track chart, and prior, Case had only used vocal samples, and it was the first time he had worked with a live vocalist in his studio.

Ed Case achieved a greater level of mainstream pop fame with his remix of Gorillaz' "Clint Eastwood". He selected that track to remix because the original was 'quite slow', and he thought that his best contribution could be made in the form of a more energetic version, featuring MC Sweetie Irie.

State Unknown
Ed Case linked up with Dan Genal in early 2013 to form State Unknown. They have performed DJ sets around the world, playing 'underground bass-driven tracks'.

Film industry career
Makromallis is currently pursuing a career involving producing scores for film, television and advertising.

Discography

Studio albums

Singles and EPs
 "Untitled" (1994), Red Face Records
 "Ed's Venture" (1994), Red Face Records
 "Flowin Through" (with Jonnie P) (1998), Imperial Records
 Da Vibes EP - Donna Cousins & Ed Case (1998), Thirst Records
 "Take Control" (1998), Street Players
 "Something in Your Eyes" (1999/2000), Unit Five Records/Red Rose Recordings - UK #38
 "Fly By Girl" (feat. Reagan) (2000), 4most Records/Utmost Records
 "When I'm with You" (feat. Valerie M) (2000), FTL
 "It's Love" (2000), Sureshot Recordings
 "Trust We" (2000), Middlerow Records
 "Who?" (with Sweetie Irie) (2001), Columbia - UK #29
 "When I Roll" (2001), Killer Instinct
 "Blazin'" (2002), Killer Instinct
 "Scandalous" (2002), Bigger Beat Records
 "Good Times" (feat. Skin) (2002), Killer Instinct/Columbia - UK #49
 "Dun Know We / Hold It Up" (feat. N.S.A) (2002), Killer Instinct
 "Blazin (The Remixes)" (2005), Love 2 Funk
 "No More" (2005), Killer Instinct
 "Back on the Case" (2005), Love 2 Funk
 The Full Throttle EP (2006), Quality Control
 "Holding On" - (DJ Sparks & Ed Case feat. Louise (2006), Quality Control
 "All I Wanna Do" (feat. Oggie) (2007), Quality Control
 "River of Love" (with Shelley Nelson) (2008), Quality Control
 "Past Love" (2016), M.I. Raw

As Ed Case & Carl H
 Steppas EP (1998), Thirst Records
 The Deep EP (1998), Middlerow Records
 "Carnival Blues / Sound Boy" (feat. Spee) (1998), Middlerow Records
 The Live EP (1998), Middlerow Records
 "Hard on Me / Milo's Tune" (1998), Middlerow Records
 "I am Here" (feat. Frankie Paul) (1999), Ultimate Beats
 "I Wanna Be the One" (2000)

References

External links
 Ed Case Twitter
 State Unknown YouTube
 RA: State Unknown

Year of birth missing (living people)
Living people
English DJs
English record producers
UK garage musicians
Musicians from London
Remixers
Columbia Records artists
Imperial Records artists
Electronic dance music DJs